Tyrone Gyle Howe (born 2 April 1971, Newtownards, Northern Ireland) formerly played in rugby union on the wing for University of St Andrews RFC, Ulster, Ireland and the British & Irish Lions.

Howe was brought up in Dromore and attended Banbridge Academy. He played for Oxford University in The Varsity Match against Cambridge in 1994 and 1995, captaining the team in 1995.

An injury resulted in a three-year absence from rugby, until he rejoined Ulster for the 1999-2000 season. On 10 June 2000, he made his senior international debut for Ireland against the United States. It was Ireland's largest win, the final score finishing 83–3. He also toured with the 2001 British & Irish Lions. In total, Howe won 14 caps for Ireland.

Howe retired from professional rugby at the end of the 2005-06 season. In 2005 he was elected to Banbridge District Council as an Ulster Unionist Party candidate. In 2007 he resigned from the council citing work commitments.  Howe now regularly appears on Sky Sports rugby coverage as a commentator and analyst, previously he has worked for Setanta Sports.

He taught at Uppingham School in Rutland for nine years and in September 2019 became headmaster of Shiplake College.

References

External links

 
 Sporting Heroes

British & Irish Lions rugby union players from Ireland
Irish rugby union players
Ireland international rugby union players
Ulster Rugby players
Dungannon RFC players
1971 births
Living people
People from Newtownards
Members of Banbridge District Council
Ulster Unionist Party councillors
Irish rugby union commentators
Alumni of the University of St Andrews
University of St Andrews RFC players
People educated at Banbridge Academy
Rugby union wings